Jimmie F. Skaggs (born 1944; died July 6, 2004) was an American actor.

Skaggs was born in Hot Springs, Arkansas, but moved to Valley City, Ohio, as a young boy. He later moved to Elyria, Ohio, as an adolescent. He got his start in acting performing in the All School play, The Great Sabastions. He graduated from Elyria High School in 1963.

Skaggs made guest appearances in numerous television shows, including The A Team, Hunter, Remington Steele, Hill Street Blues, Falcon Crest, Miami Vice, Thirtysomething, Star Trek: Deep Space Nine, Buffy The Vampire Slayer, and Curb Your Enthusiasm.

He also appeared in numerous film roles, including the bartender in Catch Me If You Can, a drug dealer in Lethal Weapon,  Smilin' Phil Fox in Underworld, Tom Scully in Cutthroat Island, Neil Gallagher in Puppet Master and Devlin in Ghost Town.

Jimmie Skaggs died at his Highland Park home of lung cancer, according to his wife, actress and director Virginia Morris. He was aged 59 at the time of his death.

Filmography

References

External links 
 

1944 births
2004 deaths
American male film actors
Actors from Hot Springs, Arkansas
Male actors from Arkansas
People from Medina County, Ohio
20th-century American male actors